The 2017 Africa Cup of Nations qualification matches were organized by the Confederation of African Football (CAF) to decide the participating teams of the 2017 Africa Cup of Nations, the 31st edition of the international men's football championship of Africa. A total of 16 teams qualified to play in the final tournament, including Gabon who qualified automatically as hosts.

Draw
A total of 52 teams entered the tournament, including the hosts (Gabon) which qualified automatically for the final tournament. The draw for the qualification stage took place on 8 April 2015, immediately after the announcement of the host nation, originally scheduled at 12:30 UTC+2 at the Marriott ‘Zamalek’ Hotel in Cairo, Egypt, but delayed to 15:00. The host nation team (Gabon) was also drawn into a group and played games against those in that group; however, these matches were only be considered as friendlies and not counted for the standings.

Due to the cancellation of Morocco being hosts of the 2015 edition, the national team of Morocco were originally banned by the Confederation of African Football (CAF) to enter the 2017 and 2019 Africa Cups of Nations. However, the ban was overturned by the Court of Arbitration for Sport, allowing Morocco to enter the tournament.

Seeding
For seeding, the teams were ranked using CAF's own system which were calculated based on the team's performance in the 2014 FIFA World Cup qualifying tournament, the three most recent editions the Africa Cup of Nations, and their qualifying campaigns.

Non-participants

Procedure
The draw procedure is as follows:
The hosts are placed in its own Pot X. A drawing of lots determines which group the hosts are "drawn" to play friendlies against (meaning this group in effect only has three teams).
The 13 teams in Pot 1 are drawn, with each group containing one team.
The 13 teams in Pot 2 are drawn, with each group containing one team.
The 13 teams in Pot 3 are drawn, with each group containing one team.
The 12 teams in Pot 4 are drawn, with each group, except the one with only three teams (where the host had already been "drawn" into), containing one team.

Format
There were thirteen groups, twelve with four teams and one with three teams (plus the host nation which played friendlies with the three teams). The group winners and two best overall runners-up qualified for the tournament. When determining the best runners-up, the group of the host nation (where only matches between three teams were counted for the standings) was not considered, as well as any group where only three teams were left due to withdrawal of one team.

Tiebreakers
The teams were ranked according to points (3 points for a win, 1 point for a draw, 0 points for a loss). If tied on points, tiebreakers were applied in the following order:
Number of points obtained in games between the teams concerned;
Goal difference in games between the teams concerned;
Goals scored in games between the teams concerned;
Away goals scored in games between the teams concerned;
If, after applying criteria 1 to 4 to several teams, two teams still have an equal ranking, criteria 1 to 4 are reapplied exclusively to the matches between the two teams in question to determine their final rankings. If this procedure does not lead to a decision, criteria 6 to 9 apply;
Goal difference in all games;
Goals scored in all games;
Away goals scored in all games;
Drawing of lots.

Schedule
The qualifiers started with the first matches played in the FIFA international dates of 8–16 June 2015.

Groups

Group A

Group B

Group C

Group D

Group E

Group F

Group G

Group H

Group I

 was also drawn into this group and played against the other three teams in the group; however, those matches were only considered friendlies and did not count for the standings.

Group J

Group K

Group L

Group M

Ranking of second-placed teams
Only groups with four teams were considered for this ranking. Therefore, Group I was not considered, as well as Group G, where only three teams were left due to the withdrawal of one team.

Qualified teams

The following teams qualified for the tournament.

1 Bold indicates champion for that year. Italic indicates host for that year.

Goalscorers
7 goals 

 Hillal Soudani

6 goals

 Getaneh Kebede

5 goals

 Stéphane Sessègnon
 Fiston Abdul Razak
 Férébory Doré
 William Jebor

4 goals

 Islam Slimani
 Mohamed Salah
 Youssef El-Arabi

3 goals

 Gelson
 Moussa Limane
 Cédric Bakambu
 Jordan Ayew
 Mohamed Zubya
 Abdoulay Diaby
 Cheikh Moulaye Ahmed
 Ernest Sugira
 Sadio Mané
 Thamsanqa Gabuza
 Yassine Chikhaoui
 Winston Kalengo
 Khama Billiat
 Knowledge Musona

2 goals

 Sofiane Feghouli
 Faouzi Ghoulam
 Saphir Taïder
 Riyad Mahrez
 Frédéric Gounongbe
 Joel Mogorosi
 Vincent Aboubakar
 Djaniny
 Vianney Mabidé
 Jordan Massengo
 Prince Oniangué
 Jonathan Bolingi
 Jordan Botaka
 Joël Kimwaki
 Paul-José M'Poku
 Ndombe Mubele
 Emilio Nsue
 Saladin Said
 Christian Atsu
 Asamoah Gyan
 Idrissa Sylla
 Zezinho
 Ayub Masika
 Anthony Laffor
 Chiukepo Msowoya
 Gerald Phiri Jr.
 Moussa Doumbia
 Modibo Maïga
 Nabil Dirar
 Domingues
 Apson Manjate
 Peter Shalulile
 Victorien Adebayor
 Jacques Tuyisenge
 Luís Leal
 Mame Biram Diouf
 Moussa Konaté
 Dine Suzette
 Keagan Dolly
 Hlompho Kekana
 Atak Lual
 Felix Badenhorst
 Sabelo Ndzinisa
 Tony Tsabedze
 Komlan Agbégniadan
 Floyd Ayité
 Kodjo Fo-Doh Laba
 Saber Khalifa
 Taha Yassine Khenissi
 Collins Mbesuma
 Cuthbert Malajila

1 goal

 Nabil Bentaleb
 Yassine Benzia
 Ryad Boudebouz
 Yacine Brahimi
 Rachid Ghezzal
 Aïssa Mandi
 Fredy
 Gilberto
 Dolly Menga
 Pana
 Khaled Adénon
 David Djigla
 Jodel Dossou
 Steve Mounié
 Mickaël Poté
 Onkabetse Makgantai
 Galabgwe Moyana
 Thabang Sesinyi
 Aristide Bancé
 Banou Diawara
 Préjuce Nakoulma
 Jonathan Pitroipa
 Alain Traoré
 Jonathan Zongo
 Pierre Kwizera
 Abbas Nshimirimana
 Enock Sabumukama
 Karl Toko Ekambi
 Benjamin Moukandjo
 Nicolas Nkoulou
 Edgar Salli
 Sébastien Siani
 Babanco
 Odaïr Fortes
 Ricardo Gomes
 Kay
 Ryan Mendes
 Nuno Jóia
 Nuno Rocha
 Garry Rodrigues
 Júlio Tavares
 Junior Gourrier
 Salif Kéïta
 Foxi Kéthévoama
 Eloge Enza Yamissi
 Youssouf M'Changama
 El Fardou Ben Nabouhane
 Mohamed Liban
 Yannick Bolasie
 Neeskens Kebano
 Elia Meschak
 Basem Morsy
 Ramy Rabia
 Ramadan Sobhi
 Carlos Akapo
 Josete Miranda
 Randy
 Iván Zarandona
 Dawit Fekadu
 Gatoch Panom
 Seyoum Tesfaye
 Mustapha Carayol
 David Accam
 Frank Acheampong
 André Ayew
 John Boye
 Jeffrey Schlupp
 Samuel Tetteh
 Mubarak Wakaso
 François Kamano
 Guy-Michel Landel
 Mohamed Yattara
 Idrissa Camará
 Cícero
 Eridson
 Frédéric Mendy
 Toni Silva
 Gervinho
 Max Gradel
 Jonathan Kodjia
 Eric Johanna
 Michael Olunga
 Paul Were
 Sunny Jane
 Tumelo Khutlang
 Ralekoti Mokhahlane
 Bokang Mothoana
 Jane Thabantso
 Francis Doe
 Gizzie Dorbor
 Sam Johnson
 Mark Paye
 Faisal Al Badri
 Sanad Al Ouarfali
 Fouad Al Triki
 Mohamed El Monir
 Almoatasembellah Mohamed
 Carolus Andriamatsinoro
 Faneva Imà Andriatsima
 Fabrice Angio Rakotondraibe
 Pascal Razakanantenaina
 Sarivahy Vombola
 John Banda
 Salif Coulibaly
 Moussa Marega
 Adama Traoré
 Molla Wagué
 Mustapha Yatabaré
 Sambou Yatabaré
 Aly Abeid
 Boubacar Bagili
 Diallo Guidileye
 Fabien Pithia
 Francis Rasolofonirina
 Andy Sophie
 Nordin Amrabat
 Aziz Bouhaddouz
 Omar El Kaddouri
 Hakim Ziyech
 Bheu Januário
 Deon Hotto
 Benson Shilongo
 Hendrik Somaeb
 Koffi Dan Kowa
 Moussa Maâzou
 Souleymane Dela Sacko
 Kelechi Iheanacho
 Etebo Oghenekaro
 Jean-Baptiste Mugiraneza
 Muhadjiri Hakizimana
 Dominique Savio Nshuti
 Fitina Omborenga
 Faduley 
 Keita Baldé
 Mohamed Diamé
 Famara Diedhiou
 Cheikhou Kouyaté
 Oumar Niasse
 Pape Souaré
 Achille Henriette
 Nelson Laurence
 Gervais Waye-Hive
 Shéka Fofana
 Kei Kamara
 Tokelo Rantie
 Sebit Bruno
 Ramadan Alagab
 Muhannad El Tahir
 Emmanuel Adebayor
 Serge Akakpo
 Vincent Bossou
 Mathieu Dossevi
 Sadat Ouro-Akoriko
 Fakhreddine Ben Youssef
 Maher Hannachi
 Hamdi Harbaoui
 Wahbi Khazri
 Hamza Lahmar
 Youssef Msakni
 Ferjani Sassi
 Naïm Sliti
 Yoann Touzghar
 Khalid Aucho
 Luwagga Kizito
 Geofrey Massa
 Tony Mawejje
 Farouk Miya
 Brian Umony
 Rainford Kalaba
 Christopher Katongo
 Costa Nhamoinesu
 Evans Rusike

1 own goal

 Ahmed El Trbi (against São Tomé and Príncipe)
 Njabulo Ndlovu (against Zimbabwe)

References

External links
Orange Africa Cup Of Nations Qualifiers 2017, CAFonline.com

 
2017
Qualification
2015 in African football
2016 in African football